is a title in the Mega Man Battle Network sub-series of Mega Man video games. The game was released only in Japan on August 6, 2004, and is not part of the main Mega Man Battle Network storyline.

Gameplay
In Real Operation, the Game Boy Advance itself acts as a PET, allowing the player to control various NetNavis from previous games in the series.  The game could also be used with the Battle Chip Gate, a Game Boy accessory that allowed players to use real-life toy Battle Chips for use in the game, a feature that would be carried over to later games in the series.  Users of Real Operation can also play multiplayer games against Battle Network 4 users and other Real Operation users. Due to the Battle Chip gate being an important part of much of the gameplay, the game was not released out of Japan for that very reason, due to the accessories, like the e-reader not being very popular in the US.

Real Operation is also compatible with the Nintendo e-Reader, which allows for the unlocking of certain Navis, some of which are required to complete the game. Navis also give unique features and mini-games to the player, such as NumberMan who will help the player study math problems. Each Navi has different personality traits to alter the playing experience as they speak and interact with the player. The game also features a real-time system and on certain days of the week, tournaments will be held in-game that the player can compete in, or you can set reminders on calendars that your Navi will keep track of. Darkloid versions of Navis that appeared in Mega Man Battle Network 4 (such as TopMan) also appear in cyberspace for the player to battle against.

During the course of the game, the player does not manually control the NetNavis in battle as in the main Battle Network games. Instead, the NetNavis act independently, and the player provides the Battle Chips by either selecting them during battle via in-game controls (in the same fashion as older Battle Network games) or by manually slotting them into the Battle Chip Gate accessory. The player can also alter the Navis' evasion strategies to guide them closer or farther from the enemies to set up attacks. This is to simulate an actual PET experience with the player as the NetOperator, and as such, no human characters appear in the game.

While the game was not released in the US, hacking in Battle Network 5: Double Team DS shows that the game can in fact, be run exactly the same way as 4.5, using the same windows and such, though the player is stuck using only Megaman and whatever chips they start with.

Navis
Initially, the player can only choose from MegaMan, Roll, GutsMan, and NumberMan as their Navi companion. However, by slotting-in the corresponding NetNavi battle chip into the Battle Chip Gate, more Navis will be unlocked for the player to use. Each Navi has unique battling styles, personalities, and mini-games to interact with. There are a total of 21 Navis for the player to use, including all 12 Soul Unison Navis from Mega Man Battle Network 4. StarMan is the only Navi who did not previously appear in a title released on the Game Boy Advance. (His only prior appearance was the GameCube-exclusive Mega Man Network Transmission.)

The playable Navis include MegaMan (Rockman in Japan), Roll, GutsMan, NumberMan, FireMan, WoodMan, WindMan, SearchMan, AquaMan (also known as SpoutMan in Battle Network 6), ThunderMan, MetalMan, JunkMan, ProtoMan (Blues in Japan), StarMan, NapalmMan, IceMan, ElecMan, PlantMan, KnightMan, ShadowMan, and Bass (Forte in Japan).

The particular Navis Capcom chose to make playable offer slight evidence that Real Operation was used as a testing ground for making Navis other than MegaMan playable in future Mega Man Battle Network titles, such as the appearance of NapalmMan, KnightMan, ShadowMan (who were all playable in Battle Network 5), Aqua, and Elec Man (playable in Battle Network 6)

Music
As a homage to the original Mega Man series, each Navi has a musical theme, and most of them are rearrangements of the themes used for their Robot Master counterparts in the original games. For example, IceMan's theme is a remixed version of his stage theme from the very first Mega Man game released on the NES. These themes play on the PET menu interface for each Navi, and some Navis have additional remixes of the same themes used for mini-games unique to them. Furthermore, Navis like Roll (who did not have themes from the original games) or ThunderMan (who was created specifically for the Battle Network series) receive new themes for this game. Finally, MegaMan's theme is instead a rearrangement of the title theme used for the first three Battle Network games, used in the original Mega Man games; ProtoMan's is his trademark "whistle" theme first introduced in Mega Man 3; and Bass's is the theme introduced in Mega Man 7 when he battles with Mega Man for the first time.

Release
Rockman EXE 4.5 Real Operation sold approximately 14,693 copies during its first few days on sale in Japan. The game remained on the Famitsu top 30 chart for three weeks. Sales topped out at 75,809 copies by the end of the year.

The game was re-released for the Wii U Virtual console in 2016.

On 26 October 2019, the game was translated to English by therockmanexezone.com with a custom box art, a complete translated manual and localisations for both Europe and the USA.

Reception 
Famitsu magazine gave it a score of 33 out of 40.

References

External links
Official Rockman EXE website 

Role-playing video games
Game Boy Advance games
Game Boy Advance-only games
Japan-exclusive video games
4.5
Multiplayer and single-player video games
Tactical role-playing video games
Video games developed in Japan
Video games scored by Akari Kaida
2004 video games